Saint Lorgius ( San Lorgio) is venerated as a martyr.  He was martyred at Caesarea Mazaca, Cappadocia.  Due to a confusion in names, Lorgius is sometimes identified with the saint named Gordius, a Roman centurion who disrupted a chariot race held in honor of Mars by coming down into the arena.  For this action, he was condemned to death.

His feast day falls on March 2.

External links
Patron Saints: Lorgius
 San Lorgio

Christian saints in unknown century
Saints from Roman Anatolia
Christian martyrs
Year of birth unknown